Thailand Amateur League, commonly known as the TA, is the fourth level of Thai football organised by Thai League Co.,Ltd. It was started in 2017 by an idea from Police General Somyot Poompanmoung, the president of Football Association of Thailand for improving all Thai Amateur clubs to be better and allowing other clubs which are in other regions chances to play in a national FA tournament. In 2017, the tournament is divided into 12 regions and participated by 119 clubs which are former members  Football Division 3, and debutants in the season. As the tournament is considered as the lowest level of Thai football, so the number of participants is unlimited as well as any club is able to send an application to participate in the tournament. In 2016, the Football Division 3 became a trophy for the Thailand Amateur League.

Champions history

Champions of the 4th tier Thai football league system (as Football Division 3)

Champions of the 5th tier Thai football league system (as Thailand Amateur League)

Champions of the 4th tier Thai football league system (as Thailand Amateur League)

See also 
 Football records in Thailand

References

 

5
Sports leagues established in 2017
2017 establishments in Thailand
Fifth level football leagues in Asia